John Warthen Holland (September 30, 1883 – November 15, 1969) was a United States district judge of the United States District Court for the Southern District of Florida.

Education and career

Born in Jackson, Tennessee, Holland received a Bachelor of Arts degree from Southwestern Baptist University (now Union University) in 1904. He received a Bachelor of Laws from Vanderbilt University Law School in 1906. He was in private practice of law in Jackson from 1906 to 1910. He was in private practice of law in Jacksonville, Florida from 1910 to 1933. He was a city attorney of Jacksonville in 1929. He was United States Attorney for the Southern District of Florida from 1933 to 1936.

Federal judicial service

Holland was nominated by President Franklin D. Roosevelt on May 26, 1936, to a seat on the United States District Court for the Southern District of Florida vacated by Judge Halsted L. Ritter. He was confirmed by the United States Senate on May 30, 1936, and received his commission on June 1, 1936. He served as Chief Judge from 1950 to 1955. He assumed senior status on July 1, 1955. His service was terminated on November 14, 1969, due to his death in Coral Gables, Florida.

References

Sources
 

1883 births
1969 deaths
Judges of the United States District Court for the Southern District of Florida
United States district court judges appointed by Franklin D. Roosevelt
20th-century American judges
Union University alumni